Chau Tsai Kok (Chinese: 洲仔角) is a small uninhabited island off the island of Tap Mun in the northeastern New Territories of Hong Kong, opposite to the village of Tap Mun. It is under the administration of Tai Po District.

 

Uninhabited islands of Hong Kong
Tai Po District
Islands of Hong Kong